Sir William Benjamin Gentle (8 September 1865 – 2 September 1948) was known for his work in fighting racecourse crime and was jointly responsible for promoting greyhound racing in the United Kingdom.

Early life
He entered the Ordnance Survey in 1882, aged 17. One year later he went to South Africa and served in the Cape Mounted Rifles for three years. When he returned to England in 1887 he joined the Metropolitan Police.

Career
Ten years later he moved to Reading and became Chief Constable of Brighton in 1901. He held the post for 19 years and became well known for his work in combating race course gangs. He was knighted Sir William Gentle for his work in 1916.

He retired to Thetford in Norfolk, where he was four times mayor and in 1938 was High Sheriff of Norfolk.

During his retirement he worked alongside Brigadier-General Alfred Critchley to form the Greyhound Racing Association (GRA), which introduced greyhound racing to the United Kingdom. He was the first chairman of the Greyhound Racing Association (GRA). He was also chairman of the Belle Vue Zoo in Manchester from 1925 to 1928.

Family
Gentle was married and had two sons. His wife died in 1941. His son Francis S 'Frank' Gentle was also a director of the GRA and went on to manage the GRA's Harringay Stadium.

He died in 1948 leaving an estate valued at £460,950.

References

1865 births
1948 deaths
People in greyhound racing
British Chief Constables
High Sheriffs of Norfolk
Knights Bachelor
Mayors of places in Norfolk
People from Brighton
People from Thetford